Pure Love is the third studio album by American country music artist Ronnie Milsap, released in 1974 by RCA Records. The album produced two #1 hits for Milsap, including his first hit "Pure Love" penned by Eddie Rabbitt and "Please Don't Tell Me How the Story Ends," which marked his debut on the Billboard Hot 100 chart, peaking at #95.

Pure Love reached #8 on Country album charts. Allmusic described the album as having "a solid country foundation" highlighting "My Love Is Deep, My Love Is Wide" and "Blue Ridge Mountains Turnin' Green" as being among a "strong set of songs."

Track listing

Charts

Weekly charts

Year-end charts

Singles

References

Further reading
Erlewine, Stephen. [ Pure Love], Allmusic.

1974 albums
Ronnie Milsap albums
RCA Records albums
Albums produced by Tom Collins (record producer)